"Funky Worm" is a song by American funk group the Ohio Players, from their album Pleasure. It peaked at number one on the U.S. Billboard R&B chart in 1973 and also peaked at number fifteen on the Billboard Hot 100. Billboard ranked it as the No. 84 song for 1973.

Influence
The song's ARP synthesizer solos, played by Junie Morrison, have become a staple part in hip hop sampling history, being sampled by artists such as MC Breed, Too $hort, Dr. Dre, Xzibit, and Game. The high-pitched whine of the synthesizer on the song was often emulated by producers from the West Coast and became a staple in G-funk music. N.W.A notably sampled "Funky Worm" on their songs "Gangsta Gangsta" and "Dope Man". Ice Cube sampled "Funky Worm" for his songs "Wicked" and "'Ghetto Bird",  duo Kris Kross' 1992 single "Jump", Lil' ½ Dead's 1994 song "East Side, West Side", Tim Dog's single "Skip to My Loot" (featuring Smooth B), DJ Jazzy Jeff and the Fresh Prince's 1993 hit "Boom! Shake the Room", and Ruff Ryders 1999 song "Bugout" also samples the song.

It was also sampled in De La Soul's "Me, Myself, & I", off their 1989 album 3 Feet High and Rising. It was also sampled for the ring entrance for L.A.X.

In popular culture
The song can be heard on the fictional radio station Bounce FM, in the video game Grand Theft Auto: San Andreas.  The Google Doodle celebrating the 44th anniversary of Hip Hop (August 11, 2017) featured the song on a virtual record that allows users to "scratch.". The song can also be heard as a Player Anthem in the video game Rocket League, where it was released in a pack called "Behind The Samples" for free on February 1, 2022.

Charts

References

1973 singles
Ohio Players songs
Fictional worms
Songs about fictional characters
Songs about insects